This is a list of airlines currently operating in Uganda, as of 2020.

Defunct airlines
This is a list of airlines which are currently out of service and/or out of business in Uganda, as of May 2019.

See also

 List of defunct airlines in Uganda
 List of airports in Uganda
 List of companies based in Uganda
 Airlines of Africa

References

Uganda
Airlines
Airlines
Uganda